Taylor Fletcher (born May 11, 1990 in Steamboat Springs, Colorado) is an American Nordic combined skier who has competed since 2006 and ski jumper since 2010. At the 2010 Winter Olympics in Vancouver, he finished 11th in the team large hill ski jumping event and 45th in the Nordic combined 10 km individual large hill event.

Fletcher's best World Cup finish was 3rd in the HS 109/ 10 km event in Seefeld (Austria) in January 2013.

His brother is also a skier, Bryan Fletcher.

References

Taylor Fletcher at the United States Olympic & Paralympic Committee
 Interview with Taylor and Bryan Fletcher 2015/03 at Nordicjumpworld.com (german and english)

1990 births
Living people
American male ski jumpers
American male Nordic combined skiers
Nordic combined skiers at the 2010 Winter Olympics
Nordic combined skiers at the 2014 Winter Olympics
Nordic combined skiers at the 2018 Winter Olympics
Nordic combined skiers at the 2022 Winter Olympics
Olympic Nordic combined skiers of the United States
Olympic ski jumpers of the United States
Ski jumpers at the 2010 Winter Olympics